McVille Municipal Airport  is a city-owned, public-use airport located one nautical mile (2 km) northwest of the central business district of McVille, a city in Nelson County, North Dakota, United States.

Facilities and aircraft 
McVille Municipal Airport covers an area of 90 acres (36 ha) at an elevation of 1,473 feet (449 m) above mean sea level. It has two runways with turf surfaces: 13/31 is 2,230 by 100 feet (680 x 30 m) and 18/36 is 2,500 by 90 feet (762 x 27 m).

For the 12-month period ending November 30, 2010, the airport had 610 aircraft operations, an average of 50 per month: 98% general aviation and 2% air taxi. At that time there were two single-engine aircraft based at this airport.

See also 
 List of airports in North Dakota

References

External links 
 McVille Municipal (8M6) at North Dakota DOT Airport Directory
 Aerial image as of September 1997 from USGS The National Map
 

Airports in North Dakota
Buildings and structures in Nelson County, North Dakota
Transportation in Nelson County, North Dakota